Podsosenye is a rural locality (a village) in Andreyevskoye Rural Settlement, Alexandrovsky District, Vladimir Oblast, Russia. The population was 1 as of 2010.

Geography 
Podsosenye is located 42 km northeast of Alexandrov (the district's administrative centre) by road. Dolgopolye is the nearest rural locality.

References 

Rural localities in Alexandrovsky District, Vladimir Oblast